United Nations Security Council resolution 1084, adopted unanimously on 27 November 1996, after reaffirming all previous resolutions on the Western Sahara, the Council discussed the implementation of the Settlement Plan for Western Sahara and extended the mandate of the United Nations Mission for the Referendum in Western Sahara (MINURSO) until 31 May 1997.

Both Morocco and Polisario Front were committed to the United Nations Settlement Plan. As part of the plan, parties had to respect the ceasefire and restart discussions. Both parties also had to have a vision for the period after the upcoming referendum. The completion of reductions by the Secretary-General Boutros Boutros-Ghali to aspects of MINURSO had been noted.

The Security Council reiterated its commitment to holding a free and fair referendum on self-determination for the people of Western Sahara. The parties had shown their good by releasing prisoners and co-operating with the Office of the United Nations High Commissioner for Refugees in pursuing humanitarian work. The Secretary-General was requested to continue his efforts to resolve the impasse in implementing the United Nations plan and to report by 28 February 1997 on the situation, including alternative steps that may be taken should there be no progress. A comprehensive report on the implementation of the current resolution was requested by 9 May 1997.

See also
 History of Western Sahara
 List of United Nations Security Council Resolutions 1001 to 1100 (1995–1997)
 Sahrawi Arab Democratic Republic
 Moroccan Western Sahara Wall

References

External links
 
Text of the Resolution at undocs.org

 1084
 1084
1996 in Morocco
November 1996 events